The Santa Monica Mountains National Recreation Area is a United States national recreation area containing many individual parks and open space preserves, located primarily in the Santa Monica Mountains of Southern California. The SMMNRA is in the greater Los Angeles region, with two thirds of the parklands in northwest Los Angeles County, and the remaining third, including a Simi Hills extension, in southeastern Ventura County.

Overall administration is by the National Park Service, coordinating with state, county, municipal, and university agencies.  The Santa Monica Mountains National Recreation Area preserves one of the best examples of a Mediterranean climate ecosystem in the world.  It also protects one of the highest densities of archaeological resources in any mountain range in the world.

In size the Santa Monica Mountains National Recreation Area is the largest urban national park in the United States and the largest urban national park in the world.

The Woolsey Fire in November 2018 burned 83% of all National Park Service land in the Santa Monica Mountains National Recreation Area.

Geography

The Santa Monica Mountains NRA contains  in the Santa Monica Mountains of the Transverse Ranges between the Pacific Ocean and inland valleys. Its southeastern slopes are part of the headwaters of the Los Angeles River. The California State Park system and other public agencies own , the National Park Service controls , and the rest of the SMMNRA lands are in local agencies parks, university study reserves, and private property conservation easements.

Park history

The movement to preserve the Santa Monica Mountains has a long tradition which is frequently overlooked by historians who often focus exclusively on the environmental movement of the 1960s and 1970s which culminated with the establishment of the Santa Monica Mountains National Recreation Area in 1978.

Griffith Park
The first area in the Santa Monica Mountains set aside for public use was Griffith Park which was donated to the city of Los Angeles by Griffith J. Griffith in 1896.

National Forest
During the first decade of the twentieth century, Frederick H. Rindge made several attempts to create a forest reserve in the Santa Monica Mountains.  These reserves were precursors to national forests.  In 1902 California's State Mining Bureau examined the area being considered for the establishment of a forest reserve.  The resulting report was sent to Washington where the proposal for a reserve was denied.

In 1907 an application was submitted to the Secretary of the Interior requesting that at least  in the mountains be designated a forest reserve.  This time state mineralogist Lewis E. Aubury opposed the venture.  He wrote the L.A. Time newspaper stating, "I believe that the lands embraced in the Malibu and Santa Monica districts should not be included in a forest reserve…I shall at once take the matter up with Gifford Pinchot, forester, Washington, D.C., and endeavor to ascertain his views on the subject, and further protest against the creation of this proposed reserve".  Days later the U. S. Forest Service advised Aubury that it was highly improbable that a forest reserve would be created owing to local opposition and the small amount of public land still remaining in the Santa Monica Mountains.

Whitestone National Park
Limestone deposits were discovered in the mountains behind Pacific Palisades in 1925 which led to a lengthy battle between wealthy home owners of the area and land developers.  The quarry site was in Traylor Canyon, three miles inland from the sea, between Santa Ynez and Temescal Canyons. Alphonzo Bell, Sr. was the real estate developer behind the quarry scheme while local opposition was led by Sylvia Morrison, who championed the preservation of the area's natural beauty.
 
After much criticism of his original plan, Bell offered a new proposal.  Using a new process, he would have the rock pulverized, mixed with water, and pumped via a buried pipeline to the mouth of Santa Ynez Canyon. The pipeline would continue from there along the ocean floor to an offshore buoy where it would be load on board a waiting ship.  Criticism of the plan grew and eventually garnered the ire of local resident Will Rogers who parodied the plan on the front page of the L.A. Times.  The debate raged citywide with such notable public figures as William Mulholland coming to Bell's defense.

In an attempt to sway public opinion, Bell urged local residents to take company-sponsored fieldtrips, on foot and on horseback, to the quarry to see the site for themselves.  Among the people who took these trips was Sylvia Morrison, who had been an early leader of environmental concerns.  She was among the visitors who scrambled up the limestone cliffs on ladders and hiked and rode on horseback through the chaparral and came away thrilled with the natural beauty of the canyons.  "Taking a cue from Yellowstone National Park, Morrison urged the establishment of Whitestone National Park in the Santa Monica Mountains, named after the by-now infamous cliffs."

Fredrick Law Olmsted
In 1930 Frederick Law Olmsted, Jr., a lifelong advocate of national parks and considered by many as the designer of the California State Parks system, proposed a network of parks, beaches, playgrounds, and forests to promote the social, economic, and environmental vitality of Los Angeles.  Olmsted also advocated for public ownership of at least  of the most scenic beach and mountain landscapes between Topanga and Point Dume.  However, the Olmsted report was essentially killed – only 200 copies were printed – due mainly to civic leaders who put politics ahead of public space.

Rindge bankruptcy
After lengthy court battles to preserve her estate, May Rindge (widow of Frederick H. Rindge) lost control of her lands and was forced into bankruptcy in 1938.  A proposal to establish a large park was considered in exchange for the cancellation of $1.1 million in unpaid taxes.  However, Los Angeles County refused the offer, thus missing the opportunity to acquire 17,000 acres of park lands.

Will Rogers State Historic Park
Will Rogers State Historic Park was created in 1944 marking the establishment of the first state park in the Santa Monica Mountains and the first public land created in the mountains since Griffith Park in 1896. It now adjoins Topanga State Park on its northeast side.

Toyon National Park
In the 1960s and 70s, and possible as early of the 1950s, another campaign was undertaken to preserve the Santa Monica Mountains.  Several proposals went before the U.S. Congress which called for the creation of Toyon National Park, referring to a dominant chaparral plant found in the area.

The legislative history of Toyon National Park dates back to 1971 when Representative Alphonzo Bell, Jr. first introduced a bill in the Congress.

Point Mugu State Park

Point Mugu State Park was the first of three large, rural state parks in the Santa Monica Mountains was established in 1967, when the State Division of Beaches and Parks, the forerunner of California State Parks, acquired title to   acres of the old Broome Ranch for $15.1 million.  This property was the first acquisition for Point Mugu State Park, and was part of the 19th century Mexican Rancho Guadalasca.  5,800 acres was purchased from Richard E. Danielson in 1972 for $2.1 million, nearly doubling the park's acreage.  This property is situated northeast of the park's original 6,700 acres and consisted of mostly backcountry.  A remaining 850-acre parcel which adjoined this property was purchased by the Santa Monica Mountains National Recreation Area from Danielson in 1980, becoming Rancho Sierra Vista open space park.

Topanga State Park

Topanga State Park was opened to the public in 1974.   The park's original name was Topanga Canyon State Park, but the name was shortened because the  park encompass large areas outside Topanga Canyon, from the Pacific Coast Highway to Mulholland Drive. The park can be accessed by car and trails from Topanga, and by trailheads in Pacific Palisades and the San Fernando Valley.

Malibu Creek State Park

In the heart of the Santa Monica Mountains, the 20th Century Fox Movie Ranch, commonly called Century Ranch, was a 2,700-acre land acquisition of what would become Malibu Creek State Park.  It was purchased by the State of California in 1974 for $4.8 million.  Reagan Ranch, a 120-acre property on the west and formerly owned by Ronald Reagan, was included in the original Century Ranch purchase.  The Hope Ranch, owned by entertainer Bob Hope and which abutted Century Ranch, was purchased in 1975 for $4.1 million.  In 1976 the State Parks and Recreation Commission adopted a compromise on the classification of the Century Ranch property, and officially named it Malibu Creek State Park.

Establishment of the National Recreation Area
The Santa Monica Mountains National Recreation Area was established November 10, 1978, after a long campaign for preservation of the Santa Monica Mountains by local and regional conservationists. Susan B. Nelson helped organize "Friends of the Santa Monica Mountains, Parks and Seashore" in 1964 and was known as the mother of the Santa Monica Mountains National Recreation Area. In 1988 though, she was concerned about the political push to end federal land purchases encouraged by Los Angeles County developers that preferred the land stay available for home building. She was encouraged though that neighboring cities in Ventura County were supportive of park expansion.

The strategy has been to grow SMMNRA by 'mosaic pieces' linking critical habitats, saving unique areas, and expanding existing parks. The Santa Monica Mountains Conservancy, a California state agency, was created in 1980 for the acquisition of land for preservation as open space, for wildlife and California native plants habitat preserves, and for public recreation activities.

One of the first land acquisitions was Rancho Sierra Vista in 1980 which is reputed to be one of the last intact ranches from the first half of the twentieth century in the Santa Monica Mountains.

Continuing land acquisitions
In 1980 the Paramount Movie Ranch was acquired in Agoura Hills, and is the present day Paramount Ranch Park. The National Park Service revitalized the old movie ranch, and it is again used for movie and television productions, and is open for public recreation and events.

The land swap was never completed, the Jordan Ranch became the Palo Commado section of the Cheeseboro Canyon / Palo Comado Canyon Open Space parks. Most of the land for the   Corral Canyon Park was finally donated by Bob Hope.

The former Ahmanson Ranch was acquired by the Santa Monica Mountains Conservancy from Washington Mutual in 2003, to create the  Upper Las Virgenes Canyon Open Space Preserve in the southeastern Simi Hills. It is adjacent to and has trailheads in Calabasas (Las Virgenes Trailhead), Woodland Hills (Victory Trailhead), and West Hills via Moore's Canyon in El Escorpión Park.

The highly visible hills with undeveloped ranch land adjacent to the junction of U.S. Route 101 and Las Virgenes Road in western Calabasas have several viewsheds now protected from development. They also serve as an unofficial gateway to the central Santa Monica Mountains National Recreation Area and its visitor center on Las Virgenes Road at King Gillette Ranch. On the southeastern side the land was formerly owned by Bob Hope, acquired by the SMM Conservancy in 2010, and added to the Las Virgenes View Park in the Santa Monica Mountains NRA. The viewshed on the northwestern side of the junction, formerly owned by Fred Sands, was acquired in 2010 and protected in the  Zev Yaroslavsky Las Virgenes Highlands Park.   Both preserve open space along the Ventura Freeway (101) between the San Fernando and the Conejo Valleys. The proposed Wallis Annenberg Wildlife Crossing is a vegetated overpass spanning the Ventura Freeway and Agoura Road at Liberty Canyon in Agoura Hills.

Rim of the Valley Trail Corridor Study
The Rim of the Valley Corridor Special Resource Study is being conducted by the National Park Service, and generally includes the mountains encircling the San Fernando, La Crescenta, Santa Clarita, Simi, and Conejo Valleys in Los Angeles and Ventura Counties. The SMMNRA is part of the Rim of the Valley Trail Corridor planning process, and several alternatives include a Rim of the Valley a SMMNRA boundary adjustment (of an approximately 173,000-acre or 313,000 acre addition). The Rim of the Valley Trail is a plan in progress for connecting the four valleys with the parklands surrounding them.

Woolsey Fire 

In 2018, the Woolsey Fire burned through 88% of the federal parkland resulting in trails being closed for months.  The fire, which was three times larger than the biggest fire ever before in the mountains, burned over 40% of the natural area in the Santa Monicas. The fire created a challenge to native plants as black mustard with bright yellow flowers quickly established itself as a wet winter followed the fire. The mustard plants will also provide fuel for the next fires. A restoration plan was developed to plant 100,000 trees, shrubs and grasses of 25 different species.

Superintendents
Robert Chandler, 1979–1982
Daniel Kuehn, 1983–1988
William Webb (Acting Superintendent), 1988–1989
David Gackenbach, 1989–1995
Arthur Eck, 1995–2002
Woody Smeck, 2002–2012
David Szymanski, 2012–present

Cultural resources

In terms of cultural heritage, the Santa Monica Mountains boast a rich history of continuous human occupation dating back more than 10,000 years and contain many nationally significant prehistoric and historic sites.  More than 1,000 archaeological sites are in the boundary of the Santa Monica Mountains National Recreation Area, making it one of the highest densities of archaeological resources found in any mountain range in the world.  There are twenty-six known Chumash pictograph sites with the national recreation area, all sacred to traditional Native American Indians, and include some that are among the most spectacular found anywhere.  These pictographs – along with other sites – have been described by the National Park Service as "unique and a significant world heritage".

Nearly every major prehistoric and historic theme associated with human interaction and development of the western United States is represented within the park from the early hunters and gathers, to Native American Indian cultures, the Spanish mission and rancho periods, and the American homestead era. Park activist Susan Nelson was instrumental in pushing for an inventory of the flora and fauna of the park and the Native American archeological resources.

At least 73 archeological sites, historic structures, cultural landscapes, and traditional cultural properties in the Santa Monica Mountains are potentially eligible for listing on the National Register of Historic Places.  The Santa Monica Looff Hippodrome on the famous Santa Monica Pier, which is within the national recreation area, is a National Historic Landmark, as is Will Rogers' house at Will Rogers State Historic Park (also within the national recreation area).  The horsemen portrayed in the Saddle Rock Ranch Pictographs in the heart of the Santa Monica Mountains are considered to be a representation of the Portola Expedition of 1769–1770, and have been determined to be eligible as a National Historic Landmark.

A number of California Historical Landmarks also lie within the Santa Monica Mountains National Recreation Area.  These include the Site of the Port of Los Angeles Long Wharf (no. 881), Point Dume (no. 965), and the Adamson House of Malibu Lagoon State Beach (no. 966).  Just outside the national recreation area is the Stagecoach Inn (no. 659) in Newbury Park, Los Encinos State Historic Park (no. 689), and the Old Santa Monica Forestry Station (no. 840).

Recreation

The Anthony C. Beilenson Interagency Visitor Center at King Gillette Ranch was opened in June 2012, and is operated by four partner agencies: National Park Service, California State Parks, Santa Monica Conservancy, Mountains Recreation and Conservation Authority.  It is located at 26876 Mulholland Highway, Calabasas, CA, 91302.

The Satwiwa Native American Indian Culture Center is the only site in the National Park Service dedicated to the past, present, and future of all Indian cultures.  A Native American guest-host or a park ranger is on hand to answer questions from 9am to 5pm on Saturdays and Sundays. Native American workshops, programs, and art shows occur throughout the year.  Satwiwa means "bluff" in the Chumash language and refers to the cliffs of Boney Mountain which can be seen from Satwiwa.  The center is located at Rancho Sierra Vista in Newbury Park.  Main Entrance cross street is Via Goleta and Potrero Road.

The main headquarters for the park is located at 401 West Hillcrest Drive, Thousand Oaks 91360.

Channel Islands National Park lies in the Pacific Ocean directly to the west.

Partners
The following list of park partners and public parklands represents a collaboration of city, county, and state agencies as well as other organizations who work together to support the Santa Monica Mountains National Recreation Area.

Allied Artists Santa Monica Mountains
Cold Creek Docents
City of Malibu Parks & Recreation Dept
The Children's Nature Institute
California Native Plant Society
Concerned Off-Road Bicyclists Association
Conejo Recreation & Park District
Coastwalk California 
Friends of Runyon Canyon
Los Angeles County Recreation & Parks Dept
L.A. Chapter of the North American Butterfly Association
Los Angeles Audubon Society
Malibu Creek Docents
Malibu Lagoon Museum Docents
Mountains Recreation & Conservation Authority
Mountains Restoration Trust
Nature Bridge
The Nature of Wildworks
Resource Conservation District of the Santa Monica Mtns
Sierra Club
San Fernando Valley Audubon Society
San Fernando Valley Gourd Patch
Santa Monica Bay Audubon Society
Santa Monica Mountains Conservancy
Santa Monica Mountains Fund
Santa Monica Mountains Natural History Association
Santa Monica Mountains Trails Council
Stunt Ranch Santa Monica Mountains Reserve
Temescal Canyon Association
Topanga Canyon Docents
Thousand Oaks Plein Air Watercolorists
TreePeople
Will Rogers State Historic Park Docents

Entrances

Main entrances to the SMMNRA include Malibu, Newbury Park, Agoura Hills, Calabasas, Woodland Hills, and Topanga, California.

Vehicles

Only electric or non-motorized model aircraft are allowed.
Only electric or non-motorized model terrestrial vehicles are allowed.
No motorized model boats are allowed on park waters.
Electric and non-motorized models were a traditional use at the Paramount Ranch area of Malibu Creek State Park.

Parks
Santa Monica Mountains NRA Park Visitor Center
The following parks and areas are managed by the National Park Service in the Santa Monica Mountains NRA:
Arroyo Sequit
Backbone Trail System
Charmlee Natural Area Park
Cheeseboro Canyon / Palo Comado Canyon open space Parks
Circle X Ranch Park
Cold Creek Canyon Preserve
Corral Canyon Park
Diamond X Ranch
Escondido Canyon Park (Escondido Falls)
King Gillette Ranch
Las Virgenes View Park
Malibu Bluffs Open Space
Paramount Ranch
Peter Strauss Ranch
Ramirez Canyon Park
Rancho Sierra Vista
Rocky Oaks
Solstice Canyon Park
Tapia Park
Triunfo Creek Park
Tuna Canyon Park
 Zuma and Trancas Canyons

The following California State Parks are in Santa Monica Mountains NRA:
 Topanga State Park
 Red Rock Canyon Park
 Leo Carrillo State Park
 Malibu Creek State Park
 Point Mugu State Park
 Will Rogers State Historic Park

State Beaches in or adjacent to Santa Monica Mountains NRA:
 Will Rogers State Beach
 Topanga State Beach
 Malibu Lagoon State Beach
 Point Dume State Beach
 El Pescador State Beach and El Matador State Beach
 Dan Blocker State Beach

See also
Santa Monica Mountains topics index
Flora of the Santa Monica Mountains
List of California state parks
Triunfo Pass

References

External links

 
 Visitor Center for Santa Monica Mountains National Recreation Area — at King Gillette Ranch Park.
 
 Wildflowers of the Santa Monica Mountains
 Outdoor LA Hiking Trails — Trail and trailhead maps and directions.
 Santa Monica Mountains Conservancy
 Santa Monica Mountains Fund
 McLellan, Dennis (May 22, 2003) Susan Nelson, 76; Mountain Parklands Advocate Obituary. Los Angeles Times
 Woo, Elaine (May 23, 2008) Hiker pushed for an L.A. national park Obituary: Jill Swift, 1928 – 2008. Los Angeles Times
 Nelson, Valerie J. (June 29, 2012) Margot Feuer dies at 89; helped create Santa Monica Mountains park Obituary. Los Angeles Times

 
National Recreation Areas of the United States

Simi Hills
Regional parks in California
National Park Service National Recreation Areas
Parks in Los Angeles
Parks in Los Angeles County, California
Parks in the San Fernando Valley
Parks in Ventura County, California
Protected areas established in 1978
Protected areas of Los Angeles County, California
Geography of Ventura County, California
National Park Service areas in California